Baruch Arnon (born 8 July 1940 in Novi Sad, Yugoslavia) is a classical pianist and renowned music teacher.  He is currently a faculty member at the Juilliard School in New York and has previously taught music at the Israel Academy of Music in Tel Aviv and Musica de Camera.

Education 

He began his music studies at an early age and studied piano with Ilona Vincze-Kraus at Israel Academy of Music.  By 1959 he was taking master classes under Edward Steuermann.  In 1962 he was studying at the Juilliard School with Irwin Freundlich and earned his B.M.  Studying under Bernard Wagenaar and Jacob Druckman, he earned his M.S. in 1965.

Professional information 

Between 1960 and 1962 he taught piano at the Israel Academy of Music.  In 1972 he became the artistic director of the Musica da Camera, a position he held until 1980.  In 1971 he began teaching at the Juilliard School.  He has been teaching piano literature and graduate studies there since 1991 and became a professor of chamber music in 2001.

He currently lives in New York and spends his time teaching there.

Bibliography and external links 
 Juilliard online
 Ashkenazy, Vladimir.  Collins Encyclopedia of Classical Music.  Collins; new ed (2000).
 Philip, Robert.  Performing Music in the Age of Recording.  Yale University Press (2004).
 Hall, Charles J.  Chronology of Western Classical Music, Volume 2.  Routledge (2002).
 Zaslaw, Neal.  Mozart's Symphonies: Context, Performance Practice, Reception.  Oxford University Press; reprint ed (1991).

1940 births
American classical pianists
American male pianists
Jewish American classical musicians
Juilliard School alumni
Juilliard School faculty
Living people
Musicians from Novi Sad
Serbian Jews
Yugoslav emigrants to the United States
20th-century American pianists
21st-century classical pianists
20th-century American male musicians
21st-century American male musicians
21st-century American pianists
21st-century American Jews